Butler Road is the name of many roads in the English-speaking world, including Maryland Route 128.

Other uses
Butler Road station, a train station in California that closed in 1983